Verkhny Buzan is a rural locality (a settlement) in Buzansky Selsoviet, Krasnoyarsky District, Astrakhan Oblast, Russia. The population was 1,826 as of 2010. There are 14 streets.

Geography 
Verkhny Buzan is located 39 km northwest of Krasny Yar (the district's administrative centre) by road. Shmagino is the nearest rural locality.

References 

Rural localities in Krasnoyarsky District, Astrakhan Oblast